Rheum palaestinum, the desert rhubarb, is a plant indigenous to Israel and Jordan with a highly developed system for gathering rainwater. 

The plant has broad, rigid leaves, with a waxy surface, and channels cut into them that funnel any water that drops onto them toward its root, with enough force to cause deep soil penetration. An alternative explanation for the evolution of the unique morphology of the rheum's leaf is that the wrinkled leaf has specifically developed its unique "architecture" as a vapor-trap, tightly capping the ground to harvest water by sub-foliar condensation of vapor rising from the earth.

It has been added to Israel's Red List of Rare and Endangered Plants, and is protected in that country by law. In Israel it only occurs in 32 locations in the inaccessible highlands of the western central Negev Desert, in populations numbering from a handful to hundreds. It furthermore also grows in southern Jordan and the mountains of northern Saudi Arabia.

It grows in rocky ground, on cliffs and amongst desert rocks, usually above 850m, and is generally associated with the plant species Artemisia sieberi.

References

palaestinum
Flora of Syria
Flora of Jordan
Flora of Israel
Flora of Palestine (region)
Flora of Western Asia
Plants described in 1945